This is a list of archaeological sites in Israel and Palestine.

Introduction 
The geographical framework of the sites listed is based on the political boundaries rather than historical, archaeological boundaries. Sites in this list are located within the territory of the modern State of Israel, including Israeli-occupied territories that were fully annexed to Israel, namely East Jerusalem (part of the West Bank) and the Golan Heights (occupied from Syria). Under the Antiquities Law of the State of Israel of 1978, the archaeological activity in these territories is de facto administered by the Israel Antiquities Authority. The list also includes sites within the Palestinian territories (claimed by the State of Palestine). Archaeological activity in these territories is administered by the Staff Officer for Archaeology in Judea and Samaria of the Israel Defense Forces and the Palestinian Department of Antiquities of the Palestinian National Authority.

The sites appear by the name in articles, and in cases where other names exist, they are listed in the "Alternative name(s)" column. The sites are also divided between different natural and geographical regions.

The chronological periods are abbreviated in this way:
 Pa - Paleolithic
 EP - Epipalaeolithic
 Ne - Neolithic
 Ch - Chalcolithic
 EB - Early Bronze Age
 IB - Intermediate Bronze Age (EB IV/MB I)
 MB - Middle Bronze Age
 LB - Late Bronze Age
 IA - Iron Age
 Pe - Persian period (Achaemenid Empire)
 He - Hellenistic period
 Ro - Roman period
 By - Byzantine period
 EM - Early Muslim period (Rashidun, Umayyad, Abbasid, and Fatimid periods)
 Cr - Crusader period
 Ma - Mamluk period
 Ot - Ottoman period

List

References 

Israel and the Palestinian territories
Archaeological sites in Israel
Archaeological sites in the State of Palestine
archaeological
archaeological